Molybdenum tetrachloride is the inorganic compound with the empirical formula MoCl4.  The material exists as two polymorphs, both being dark-colored paramagnetic solids. These compounds are mainly of interest as precursors to other molybdenum complexes.

Structure
The α polymorph is a polymer. The β polymorph is a hexamer.  In both polymorph, the Mo center is octahedral with two terminal chloride ligands and four doubly bridging ligands.  In addition to these two binary phases, a number of adducts are know with the formula  where L is a Lewis base.

Preparation
α-Molybdenum tetrachloride can be prepared from by dechlorination of molybdenum pentachloride using tetrachloroethene:
 2MoCl5  +  C2Cl4   →  2MoCl4  +  C2Cl6

Heating α-molybdenum tetrachloride in a sealed container in the presence of molybdenum pentachloride induces conversion to the β polymorph.

Reactions
When heated in an open container, molybdenum tetrachloride evolves chlorine, giving molybdenum trichloride; 
 2MoCl4   →  2MoCl3  +  Cl2

The acetonitrile complex adduct can be prepared by reduction of the pentachloride with acetonitrile:
 2MoCl5  +  5CH3CN   →  2MoCl4(CH3CN)2  +  ClCH2CN  +  HCl
The MeCN ligands can be exchanged with other ligands:
 MoCl4(CH3CN)2  +  2THF   →  MoCl4(THF)2  +  2CH3CN

The pentachloride can be reduced to the ether complex MoCl4(Et2O)2 using tin powder. It is a beige, paramagnetic solid.

References

Chlorides
Molybdenum halides